Herman Doncker (c. 1600 – c. 1666), was a Dutch Golden Age painter.

According to the RKD he worked in Haarlem during the years 1633–1640, and signed his works 'H. Doncker', or 'HD'. He dated portraits from 1627–1640.
He painted some works for the council of Enkhuizen.

References

 
Herman Doncker on Artnet

1600s births
1660s deaths
Dutch Golden Age painters
Dutch male painters
Artists from Haarlem